Elaan  (Hindi: ऐलान) is a 1947 Indian Bollywood Muslim social melodrama film. It was the sixth highest grossing Indian film of 1947. The film emphasis on the need of education and is considered on the best film in the genre of Muslim social.

Cast 

 Surendra
 Munawwar Sultana
 imalayawala
 Zebunissa

References

External links
 

1947 films
1940s Hindi-language films
Films directed by Mehboob Khan
Indian black-and-white films
Indian drama films
1947 drama films
Melodrama films
Hindi-language drama films